Propeamussium is a genus of saltwater clams, marine bivalve mollusks in the order Ostreoida. 

Fossil species of these epifaunal carnivores lived from the Triassic period to the Pliocene age (235.0 to 3.6 Ma). The majority of fossils of this genus are found throughout Europe and North America.

Selected species
 Propeamussium alcocki (E. A. Smith, 1894)
 Propeamussium andamanense (Bavay, 1905)
 Propeamussium andamanicum (E. A. Smith, 1894)
 Propeamussium arabicum Dijkstra & R. Janssen, 2013
 Propeamussium boucheti Dijkstra & Maestrati, 2008
 Propeamussium caducum (E. A. Smith, 1885)
 † Propeamussium cowperi Waring, 1917 
 Propeamussium dalli (E. A. Smith, 1885)
 Propeamussium investigatoris (E. A. Smith, 1906)
 Propeamussium jeffreysii (E. A. Smith, 1885)
 Propeamussium lucidum (Jeffreys in Wyville-Thomson, 1873))-
 Propeamussium malpelonium (Dall, 1908)
 Propeamussium meridionale (E. A. Smith, 1885)
 Propeamussium octodecimliratum Melvill & Standen, 1907
 † Propeamussium papakurense (E. Clarke, 1905) 
 Propeamussium regillum Dijkstra & Maestrati, 2017
 Propeamussium richeri Dijkstra, 2001
 Propeamussium rosadoi Dijkstra & Maestrati, 2015
 Propeamussium rubrotinctum (Oyama, 1951)
 Propeamussium sibogai (Dautzenberg & Bavay, 1904)
 Propeamussium siratama (Oyama in Kuroda, 1951)
 Propeamussium steindachneri (Sturany, 1899)
 Propeamussium watsoni (E. A. Smith, 1885)
 † Propeamussium yubarense (Yabe & Nagao, 1928) 
 † Propeamussium zitteli (Hutton, 1873) 
 Propeamussium zoniferum (Dautzenberg & Bavay, 1912)

Synonyms
 Propeamussium holmesii (Dall, 1886): synonym of Parvamussium holmesii (Dall, 1886)
 Propeamussium pourtalesianum (Dall, 1886): synonym of Parvamussium pourtalesianum (Dall, 1886)
 Propeamussium sayanum (Dall, 1886): synonym of Parvamussium sayanum (Dall, 1886)
 Propeamussium squamigerum (E. A. Smith, 1885): synonym of Parvamussium squamigerum (E. A. Smith, 1885)

References

 Frederick A. Sundberg - Propeamussium Species (Bivalvia: Propeamussiidae) from the Upper Cretaceous of Southern California - Journal of Paleontology, Vol. 63, No. 1 (Jan., 1989), pp. 53–63
 Coan, E. V.; Valentich-Scott, P. (2012). Bivalve seashells of tropical West America. Marine bivalve mollusks from Baja California to northern Peru. 2 vols, 1258 pp.

External links
  Oyama K. (1944). [Classification of the genus Propeamussium [in Japanese]. Venus. 13(5-8): 240-254]
 de Gregorio, A. (1884). Nota intorno ad alcune nuove conchiglie mioceniche di Sicilia. Il Naturalista Siciliano. 3 (4): 119-120
 Dijkstra, H. H. (1995). Bathyal Pectinoidea (Bivalvia: Propeamussiidae, Entoliidae, Pectinidae) from New Caledonia and adjacent areas. in: Bouchet, P. (Ed.) Résultats des Campagnes MUSORSTOM 14. Mémoires du Muséum national d'Histoire naturelle. Série A, Zoologie. 167: 9-73
 Dijkstra, H. H. (2013). Pectinoidea (Bivalvia: Propeamussiidae and Pectinidae) from the Panglao region, Philippine Islands. Vita Malacologica. 10: 1-108

Propeamussiidae
Bivalve genera